Waraqu (Quechua for cactus, Hispanicized spelling Barraco) is a mountain in the Waqurunchu mountain range in the Andes of Peru, about  high. It is located in the Pasco Region, Pasco Province, Huachón District. It lies northeast of Ñat'iqucha and southeast of Waqurunchu and Yanaqucha.

References

Mountains of Peru
Mountains of Pasco Region